Huntington Place station is a Detroit People Mover station in downtown Detroit, Michigan. It is located inside the Huntington Place convention center, formerly known as Cobo Center and later as TCF Center, on the third floor near Congress Street. The track was originally built out in the open, and later enclosed by Cobo Center's late 1980s expansion. The station opened as an infill station in 1989, as the last of the system's thirteen stations to open. The track passes above the main convention hall, and as such, passing trains can be heard from portions of the convention floor.

Originally known as Cobo Center, the station was renamed Convention Center in 2019, when Cobo Center itself was renamed TCF Center. The station was renamed again as Huntington Place upon its reopening in May 2022, following the convention center's renaming as Huntington Place.

The People Mover shut down temporarily on March 30, 2020, due to decreased ridership amid the COVID-19 pandemic. Huntington Place, newly renamed, was one of six stations to reopen when the system restarted on May 20, 2022.

Convention Center is one of only two stations (with Millender Center being the other) on the People Mover route where passengers can take escalators down from the platform to street level. Ten other stations have escalators going up only, and two others (Grand Circus Park and West Riverfront) have none.

See also

 List of rapid transit systems
 List of United States rapid transit systems by ridership
 Metromover
 Transportation in metropolitan Detroit

References

External links
 DPM station overview

Detroit People Mover stations
Railway stations in the United States opened in 1989
1989 establishments in Michigan